Olapa tavetensis is a moth of the family Erebidae first described by William Jacob Holland in 1892.

Distribution
It is found in Burundi, Cameroon, Comoros, the Republic of the Congo, the Democratic Republic of the Congo, Kenya, Nigeria, South Africa, Sudan and Tanzania.

This species has a wingspan of 40 mm. The wings are white with two minute black spots at the end of the cells of the primaries.

References

Lymantriini
Moths described in 1892
Moths of Africa